Duck Island is a small island located just inside the Wisconsin border, in the town of Phelps, Vilas County, Wisconsin, United States. The island is one of two inhabited islands in Lac Vieux Desert, the other being Draper Island, Michigan.

Climate

Notes 

Landforms of Vilas County, Wisconsin
Lake islands of Wisconsin